Margaret Murray Robertson (22 April 1823 – 14 February 1897) was a Scottish-Canadian teacher and writer.

Biography
Margaret was born in Stuartfield, Scotland, 22 April 1823, the daughter of Reverend James Robertson, Congregational minister, and Elizabeth Murray. She had a sister Mary and brothers John, Joseph, and Andrew. In 1832, her mother died, whereupon the devout family emigrated to Derby, Vermont. Four years later, they moved to Sherbrooke in Quebec. Both Mary and Margaret attended Mount Holyoke Female Seminary in Massachusetts. Afterward, they became instructors at the Sherbrooke Ladies' Academy, where Margaret remained until 1865.

In 1864, she won the Galt Prize essay competition with an essay titled "An Essay on Common School Education." At the age of 42, Margaret left her teaching career to become a full-time writer. Her first novel, Christie Redfern's Troubles, was published in 1866. During her writing career, she had 14 or more novels published up through 1890. Most of the protagonists in her novels were female, and the themes were of home and family.

She died in Montreal in 1897.

Bibliography

Christie Redfern's troubles (1866)
Christie, or, the way home (1866), two volumes
Stephen Grattan's faith (1867)
The Orphans of Glen Elder (1868)
Ethan Hale, or, light at last (1869)
Janet's Love and Service (1869)
The little house in the hollow (1869)
Little Serena in a strange land (1870)
The Inglises, or, how the way opened (1872)
The twa Miss Dawsons (1880)
The perils of orphanhood (1881)
Frederica and her guardians: the perils of orphanhood (1881)
The story of Little Gabriel (1881)
Shenac's work at home (1883)
Eunice (1887)
Allison Bain, or, by a way she knew not (1887)
David Fleming's forgiveness (1891)

References

External links
 
 
 

1823 births
1897 deaths
19th-century British women writers
19th-century Canadian essayists
19th-century Canadian novelists
19th-century Canadian women writers
19th-century Scottish novelists
Canadian women essayists
Canadian women novelists
Scottish emigrants to Canada
Writers from Quebec